Gary Smith (born 1965) is a Scottish trade union leader.

Born in Edinburgh, Smith completed an apprenticeship as a Gas Fitter, joining the GMB at the age of 16.  He became a shop steward and when he was 26 the union paid for him to study at Ruskin College, which he followed with a master's degree in industrial relations from Warwick University.

After completing his education, Smith returned to working in the gas industry, and to trade union activism. He began working full-time for the union, as Recruitment Officer, then as a Senior Organiser, National Officer, and then as National Secretary for Commercial Services. In 2015, he became the union's Scotland Secretary.  In this role, he was frequently critical of the Scottish National Party government. A supporter of Keir Starmer's leadership of the Labour Party, he opposed Richard Leonard's efforts to remain leader of Scottish Labour, despite Leonard being a member of the GMB.

In 2021, Smith was elected as General Secretary of the union, defeating Rehana Azam and Giovanna Holt.  As General Secretary, he pledged to implement the recommendations of a report by Karon Monaghan QC, which argued that the union had problems with "bullying, misogyny, cronyism and sexual harassment".

Smith urged the Labour Party to back fracking in September 2022, telling them not to bow to the "bourgeois environmental lobby".

References

Living people
Alumni of Ruskin College
Alumni of the University of Warwick
General Secretaries of the GMB (trade union)
Members of the General Council of the Trades Union Congress
Trade unionists from Edinburgh
Scottish trade unionists
1965 births